The Capt. Thomas Fanning Farmstead is a historic farm property at 1004 Shewville Road in Ledyard, Connecticut. With a building history dating to about 1746, it is one of the oldest surviving agricultural properties in the town, including the house, barn, and smaller outbuildings.

Description and history
The Captain Thomas Fanning Farmstead is located in a rural setting in northern Ledyard, near the town line with Preston.  It is set on four acres on the east side of Shewville Road, one of which houses the buildings of the farmstead around a grassy meadow.  The house is a 1-1/2 story Cape style wood frame structure, with a central chimney.  It is oriented with its main facade angled away from the road, toward the southeast.  That facade is five bays wide, with a center entrance.  A shed-roof section extends the building to the rear (toward the street).  Outbuildings spread around the meadow include an 18th-century barn, and several 19th-century farm buildings: a corn crib, blacksmith shop, sheds, and another small barn.  Some of the outbuildings stand on older foundations than what their construction methods suggest.

The documented history of the property begins in 1746-47, when Thomas Fanning purchased  from Jonathan Brewster of Preston, with a barn standing on it.  A portion of the house (roughly the western three bays) was built by Fanning not long afterward, and was probably widened to five bays by Fanning's son Frederick, who took over the property in 1789.  He sold the property to his brother-in-law in 1793.

See also
National Register of Historic Places listings in New London County, Connecticut

References

National Register of Historic Places in New London County, Connecticut
Colonial architecture in the United States
Houses completed in 1746
Houses in New London County, Connecticut
Ledyard, Connecticut